Kenneth Frederick Pestell (born 7 May 1931) is a former English first-class cricketer.

A banker by profession, Pestell played a single first-class cricket match for D. R. Jardine's XI against Oxford University at Eastbourne in 1957. Batting twice in the match, Pestell was dismissed for 16 runs by Robert Wilson in the D. R. Jardine's XI first-innings, while in their second-innings he was dismissed for 21 runs by Ian Gibson. He also bowled five wicket-less overs in the match with his right-arm medium pace bowling.

References

External links

1931 births
Living people
People from Edmonton, London
English bankers
English cricketers
D. R. Jardine's XI cricketers